The el-Jazzar Mosque (Misgad al-G'zar), also known as the White Mosque of Acre, is located on el-Jazzar Street inside the walls of the old city of Acre, overlooking the eastern Mediterranean Sea, and is named after the Ottoman Bosnian governor Ahmad Pasha el-Jazzar.

History

The el-Jazzar Mosque was the project of its namesake, Ahmad Pasha el-Jazzar, the Acre-based governor of the Sidon and Damascus provinces, who was famous for his impressive public works and defeat of Napoleon Bonaparte at the Siege of Acre in 1799. El-Jazzar ordered the mosque's construction in 1781 and had it completed within the year. Despite lacking architectural training, el-Jazzar was the architect of the mosque, drawing up its plans and design, and supervising its entire construction. In addition to the mosque itself, the complex included an Islamic theological academy with student lodging, an Islamic court and a public library. The mosque was built for religious purposes, but its grandiose size and additional functions were also intended by el-Jazzar to serve as a means of consolidating his political legitimacy as ruler of Ottoman Syria. He modeled the mosque on the mosques of Istanbul, the Ottoman capital.
 
The el-Jazzar Mosque was built over former Muslim and Christian prayer houses and other Crusader buildings, including military architecture. Building materials for the mosque, particularly its marble and granite components, were taken from the ancient ruins of Caesarea, Atlit and medieval Acre. El-Jazzar commissioned several Greek masons as the mosque's builders. There is a tughra or monogram on a marble disc inside the gate, naming the ruling Sultan, his father, and bearing the legend "ever-victorious."

Adjacent to the mosque is a mausoleum and small graveyard containing the tombs of Jazzar Pasha and his adoptive son and successor, Sulayman Pasha, and their relatives.

Architecture
The mosque is an excellent example of Ottoman architecture, which incorporated both Byzantine and Persian styles. Some of its fine features include the green dome and minaret, a green-domed sabil next to its steps (a kiosk, built by Sultan Abdul Hamid II, for dispensing chilled drinking water and beverages) and a large courtyard. 

The mosque, which dominates Acre's skyline, was originally named Masjid al-Anwar (the "Great Mosque of Lights") and is also known as the White Mosque because of its once silvery-white dome that glittered at a great distance. The dome is now painted green. The minaret has a winding staircase of 124 steps.

It is the largest mosque in modern-day Israel outside of Jerusalem.

Historian Nur Masalha describes the Mosque as notable for its "mixture of styles, Ottoman Byzantine, Palestinian, and Persian, incorporating and recycling the extraordinarily rich martial and cultural heritage of Palestine."

Sha'r an-Nabi
The mosque houses the Sha'r an-Nabi, a hair (or lock of hair) from the beard of the Prophet Muhammad. The Sha'r an-Nabi used to be paraded through Acre on Eid al-Fitr, ending the fast of Ramadan, but is now only shown to the congregation. The relic is kept inside the mosque in a glass cabinet placed at the women's upper floor gallery.

Gallery

References 

Ottoman Palestine
Mosques in Acre, Israel
Mosques converted from churches in the Ottoman Empire
1781 establishments in the Ottoman Empire
Mosques completed in 1781
Mosque buildings with domes